The Palazzo Reale (Royal Palace) or Palazzo Stefano Balbi is a major palace in Genoa.

History

Construction of the present structure began in 1618 for the Balbi family. From 1643 to 1655, work renewed under the direction of the architects Pier Francesco Cantone and Michele Moncino. In 1677, the palace was sold to the Durazzo Family, who enlarged the palace under the designs of Carlo Fontana.

In 1823, the palace was sold to the Royal House of Savoy. From 1919, the palace has belonged to the state.

Decor
The palace contains much original furniture and decoration. Frescoes inside include the Glory of the Balbi Family by Valerio Castello and Andrea Sghizzi, Spring changing slowly to Winter  by Angelo Michele Colonna and Agostino Mitelli, and  Jove establishes Justice on the Earth by Giovanni Battista Carlone. It also contains canvases by Bernardo Strozzi, il Grechetto, Giovanni Battista Gaulli, Domenico Fiasella as well as Bassano, Tintoretto, Luca Giordano, Anthony van Dyck, Ferdinand Voet, and Guercino. It contains statuary by Filippo Parodi.

Gallery

See also
List of Baroque residences
Palazzi dei Rolli

References

External links

Official site of the Royal Palace

Houses completed in 1655
Reale
Reale
Palazzi dei Rolli
Museums in Genoa
Historic house museums in Italy
Royal residences in Italy
National museums of Italy
Art museums and galleries in Genoa
1655 establishments in Italy